Abubaker Kaki Khamis (born 21 June 1989) is a Sudanese runner who specializes in the 800 metres. He is a two-time World Indoor Champion over the distance and also won gold at the 2007 All-Africa Games. He represented Sudan at the 2008 and 2012 Summer Olympics. He is a member of the Messiria ethnic minority.

Running career
In February 2008 he ran a world-leading 2:15.7 in the 1000 m indoors in Sweden. On March 9, 2008, in Valencia, Kaki became the youngest ever World Indoor champion after winning the 800 m final at age 18 years and 262 days. On June 6, 2008, he won the Bislett Games Golden League meeting in Oslo by running 1:42.69, a new world junior record. The previous record (1:43.64) was set by Japheth Kimutai of Kenya in 1997. The following month he entered the 2008 World Junior Championships in Athletics as the 800 m favorite. He was closely followed by Geoffrey Kibet in the final but he managed to pull clear on the final straight to win the gold medal.

Kaki finished 8th in the third semi-final for the 800 m and did not advance to the final at the 2008 Summer Olympics in Beijing. In the 2009 World Championships in Berlin he tripped in the semi-final, and did not complete the race.

Kaki retained his title at the 2010 IAAF World Indoor Championships at the age of twenty, becoming only the second athlete after Paul Ereng to complete the feat in the men's 800 m. In the outdoor season, he made his first appearance in the 2010 IAAF Diamond League in an 800 m match-up against David Rudisha. Both runners defeated Sebastian Coe's 31-year-old meeting record, but Kaki was not fast enough to beat Rudisha. Kaki's time of 1:42.23 was a new Sudanese record and, at the time, the fastest 800 m time ever recorded for a non-winning athlete. He won at the Memorial Primo Nebiolo later that month in another quick time of 1:43.48. Since then he made the 800m final at the London 2012 Olympic Games where he finished 7th in 1.43.32, a season's best performance.

Achievements

Personal bests

All Information taken from IAAF profile.

Key: † = National record

References

External links

Read Abubaker Kaki Khamis' Rising Star profile on spikesmag.com

1989 births
Living people
People from West Kurdufan
Sudanese male middle-distance runners
Olympic athletes of Sudan
Olympic male middle-distance runners
Athletes (track and field) at the 2008 Summer Olympics
Athletes (track and field) at the 2012 Summer Olympics
World Athletics Championships medalists
World Athletics Championships athletes for Sudan
African Games gold medalists for Sudan
African Games medalists in athletics (track and field)
Athletes (track and field) at the 2007 All-Africa Games
World Athletics Indoor Championships winners